Hajjiabad (also Romanized as Ḩajjīābād and Ḩājjīābād) is a village in Kiar-e Gharbi Rural District, in the Central District of Kiar County, Chaharmahal and Bakhtiari Province, Iran. At the 2006 census, its population was 640, in 151 families. The village is populated by Lurs.

References 

Populated places in Kiar County
Luri settlements in Chaharmahal and Bakhtiari Province